Mathias Le Turnier (born 14 March 1995 in Audenge) is a French cyclist, who currently rides for UCI Continental Team . In August 2018, he was named in the startlist for the Vuelta a España. In October 2020, he was named in the startlist for the 2020 Giro d'Italia.

Major results
2016
 2nd Overall Ronde de l'Isard
 2nd Overall Tour de Gironde
2018
 1st  Young rider classification Tour La Provence
2019
 10th Overall Tour du Haut Var
1st  Young rider classification
 10th Overall Tour de Hongrie

Grand Tour general classification results timeline

References

External links

1995 births
Living people
French male cyclists
Sportspeople from Gironde
Cyclists from Nouvelle-Aquitaine